Yaphank is a hamlet and census-designated place (CDP) in Suffolk County, New York, United States. The population was 5,945 at the time of the 2010 census.

Yaphank is located in the south part of the Town of Brookhaven. It is served by the Longwood Central School District, except for extreme southwestern Yaphank, which is served by the South Country Central School District.

In the 1930s, Yaphank was a center of American Nazism where Camp Siegfried drew up to a thousand weekly visitors from New York City for pro-Nazi rallies and vacationing.

History 

Captain Robert Robinson came to Yaphank and built his Dutch Colonial house with the building dated at 1726. He was then granted permission to dam the Carmans River to build a mill across the street from his house. The construction of this mill in 1739 was considered the founding date of the Hamlet of Yaphank.

In the mid 18th century, John Homan built two mills along the Carmans River, which runs directly through the center of the town. These two mills inspired the first name for the town: Millville. The translator/author Mary Louise Booth was born in Millville in 1831. In 1846 a post office was opened in the town, but because there were thirteen other towns named "Millville" in New York state at the time, the town was renamed "Yaphank", from the local Native American word Yamphanke, meaning "bank of a river".

In 1843 the Long Island Rail Road built a railroad station in Yaphank (still named Millville at the time), and virtually overnight the small mill town became a major commercial center. By 1875, Yaphank had two grist mills, two lumber mills, two blacksmith shops, a printing office, an upholstery shop, a stagecoach line, two physicians, a shoe shop, two wheelwright shops, a meat market, a dressmaker and a general store.

Today, Yaphank is home to about half of those industries. The grist mills, blacksmith, physician, shoe shop, wheelwright shops, meat markets and the dressmakers are long gone, although the rail road station is still there, along with the general stores.

Today, Yaphank holds three delis, one pizza shop, a shooting supply company, a skeet range, a bank, and a house moving company.

Yaphank was the home of Camp Upton, which was used as a boot camp in 1917. In 1947, the U.S. Department of War transferred the Camp Upton site to the Atomic Energy Commission, and it now serves as the home of Brookhaven National Laboratory. Before the end of World War I, more than 30,000 men received their basic training there, including songwriter Irving Berlin. It was there that Berlin composed the musical comedy revue Yip Yip Yaphank, which had a brief run on Broadway, and wrote the patriotic tune "God Bless America".

A number of Suffolk County facilities are located in Yaphank, including Suffolk County Police Department headquarters, the county fire academy, and the Suffolk County Farm and Education Center, which offers a glimpse into the workings of an authentic 100+ year old farm and educational programs by Cornell Cooperative Extension.

A quarter horse racing facility named Parr Meadows operated in Yaphank in 1977. The racetrack reopened in 1986 for a single meet, then called Suffolk Meadows. In 1979, Parr Meadows served as the venue of a tenth anniversary reunion concert that featured many of the original performers from the Woodstock Festival.

Camp Siegfried and Nazism

In the 1930s, Yaphank was home to Camp Siegfried, a summer camp that taught Nazi ideology. It was owned by the German American Bund, an American Nazi organization devoted to promoting a favorable view of Nazi Germany, and operated by the German American Settlement League (GASL). 

Camp Siegfried was one of many such camps in the US in the 1930s, including Camp Hindenburg in Grafton, Wisconsin, Camp Nordland in Andover, New Jersey, and Deutschhorst Country Club in Sellersville, Pennsylvania. 

Until 2017, homes in the former Camp Siegfried area, on land that was owned by the German-American Settlement League, were under covenants restricting residents to those of German extraction only.

Geography

Demographics of the CDP
As of the census of 2000, there were 5,025 people, 1,566 households, and 1,130 families residing in the CDP. The population density was 359.5 per square mile (138.8/km2). There were 1,650 housing units at an average density of 118.0/sq mi (45.6/km2). The racial makeup of the CDP was 85.11% White, 11.22% African American, 0.24% Native American, 1.03% Asian, 0.04% Pacific Islander, 0.94% from other races, and 1.41% from two or more races. Hispanic or Latino of any race were 7.34% of the population.

There were 1,566 households, out of which 33.5% had children under the age of 18 living with them, 55.5% were married couples living together, 11.9% had a female householder with no husband present, and 27.8% were non-families. 21.9% of all households were made up of individuals, and 6.8% had someone living alone who was 65 years of age or older. The average household size was 2.69 and the average family size was 3.14.

In the CDP, the population was spread out, with 21.9% under the age of 18, 8.0% from 18 to 24, 34.6% from 25 to 44, 24.0% from 45 to 64, and 11.6% who were 65 years of age or older. The median age was 37 years. For every 100 females, there were 115.3 males. For every 100 females age 18 and over, there were 118.1 males.

The median income for a household in the CDP was $70,534, and the median income for a family was $72,348. Males had a median income of $48,807 versus $35,406 for females. The per capita income for the CDP was $25,020. About 3.3% of families and 3.8% of the population were below the poverty line, including 4.8% of those under age 18 and 4.7% of those age 65 or over.

Notable person

Fred Hembeck (born 1953) - comic book writer and illustrator

See also

 Brookhaven Rail Terminal
 Robert Hawkins Homestead
 Homan-Gerard House and Mills
 St. Andrew's Episcopal Church (Yaphank, New York)
 Suffolk County Almshouse Barn

References

External links

 Yaphank History (Longwood Public Library)

Brookhaven, New York
Census-designated places in New York (state)
Hamlets in New York (state)
Census-designated places in Suffolk County, New York
Hamlets in Suffolk County, New York